The Salaberry Armoury, is an historic armoury located in Gatineau, Quebec, Canada, that is home to the armoured Régiment de Hull.  The  armoury located just to the west of the Hull sector in downtown Gatineau on a  lot. The armoury is a prominent local landmark. In the Canadian Forces, an armoury is a place where a reserve unit trains, meets, and parades.

History
Le Régiment de Hull, which is housed in Salaberry Armoury, formed on 7 August 1914. The Regiment, which is a unit of the Reserve Armoured Corps, is the only Francophone unit in the National Capital Region. The armoury was built beginning on 1 January 1938, designed by the architect Lucien Sarra-Bournet in the late Château Style with a steeply pitched gable roof and prominent chimneys.

The armoury was named after Colonel Charles de Salaberry, a hero of the War of 1812. The armoury, which has been identified as an historic site is one of a series of armouries built across Canada during the 1930s. During World War II, this building was the scene of local recruitment efforts.

Salaberry Armoury is a Recognized Federal Heritage Building.

Legacy

A plaque was erected by the Royal Canadian Legion Branch 30 Hull with a quote from the poem For the Fallen by Robert Laurence Binyon:
"They shall grow not old, as we that are left grow old:
Age shall not weary them, nor the years condemn.
At the going down of the sun and in the morning
We will remember them"

A plaque was erected in the spring of 1974 for the 60th anniversary of the founding of the Regiment de Hull.

References

Régiment de Hull – History in details

See also
List of armouries in Canada

Buildings and structures in Gatineau
Armouries in Canada
Heritage sites in Outaouais